Stephanie D. Neely was the Treasurer of the City of Chicago, Illinois. She was appointed as Treasurer for the City of Chicago in October 2006, and was sworn in December 2006. Neely was reelected to a second term in February 2011. Neely resigned to return to the private sector on November 30, 2014.  In 2015, she became vice president of treasury for Allstate Insurance Company, where she oversees corporate finance and commercial banking.

Early life and career
Stephanie Neely is a native Chicagoan. Neely's father owned and operated a successful chain of gas stations located on the southside of Chicago.  Neely attended Smith College and graduated with a bachelor's in economics in 1985. She later earned a M.B.A. from University of Chicago. Prior to serving as City Treasurer, Neely served as Vice President at Northern Trust Global Investments. Neely accumulated more than 20 years of private-sector financial experience before being appointed City Treasurer. In 2004, Mayor Daley chose Stephanie Neely to serve on the Illinois Sports Facilities Authority.

Treasurer
On November 8, 2006, Mayor Richard M. Daley appointed Neely the Chicago City Treasurer to take office December 4, 2006. A week later, she was confirmed by the Chicago City Council on November 15, 2006. Neely succeeded Judith Rice, who stepped down from the position effective December 1, 2006, to rejoin Daley's administration as a deputy mayor.  Pursuant to her role as City Treasurer, Neely maintained a $7 billion portfolio and tracked the balances on all City accounts. The City pension fund has posted double-digit returns on pension fund investments during Neely's tenure. In addition to her duties as Treasurer, Neely serves as trustee on the City’s five public pension boards. Programs operated by the Treasurer's Office during Neely's tenure included Small Business Development Loans, Financial Literacy programs in Chicago Public Schools, and free seminars on using social media to build small business.

In 2013, while Treasurer, Neely was considered a finalist to be Pat Quinn's running mate in the 2014 Illinois gubernatorial election after then-incumbent Lieutenant Governor Sheila Simon opted to run for Illinois Comptroller. Quinn ultimately chose Paul Vallas.

References

External links
 http://www.chicagocitytreasurer.com
 https://web.archive.org/web/20140812043610/http://www.chicagocitytreasurer.com/treasurer-stephanie-d-neely/

Year of birth missing (living people)
Living people
Women in Illinois politics
Smith College alumni
University of Chicago Booth School of Business alumni
City Treasurers of Chicago
Illinois Democrats
Businesspeople from Chicago
21st-century American women